Mane Katti Nodu is a 1966 Indian Kannada-language film, directed by Sri Sadguru and produced by C. V. Shivashankar and Friends. The film stars Udaykumar, Hanumantha Rao, Shivashankar and Thipatur Raghu in lead roles. The film's musical score was written by R. Rathna.

Cast

VN Narayan(main actor)
uday kumar(side cast)
Hanumantha Rao
Shivashankar
Thipatur Raghu
Dwarakish
Shanthala
Meenakumari
Lalitha
Ambujadevi
Leela Jayanthi
Tiger Prabhakar
Madhu Kumar
Jamakhandi Gururaj
Ramadas
Ramu
Lakshmi Thalikote
R. Jayanthi
Nalini
Chandra
Vijaya
Kannika
Baby Vasuda
Baby Rekha
Manjula (credited as Baby Manjula)

References

External links
 

1960s Kannada-language films